Results from Norwegian football in 1935.

Class A of local association leagues
Class A of local association leagues (kretsserier) is the predecessor of a national league competition.

1In the following season, Røyken og Hurum local association merged with Drammen og omegn to form Drammen og omegn.

Norwegian Cup

Final

Northern Norwegian Cup

Final

National team

May 31: Norway – Hungary 2–0, friendly

June 23: Denmark – Norway 1–0, friendly

June 27: Norway – Germany 1-1, friendly

September 8: Finland – Norway 1–5, friendly

September 22: Norway – Sweden 0–2, friendly

November 3: Switzerland – Norway 2–0, friendly

References

 
Seasons in Norwegian football